Hermia and Lysander is a watercolor painting created in 1870 by British illustrator and miniature portrait painter John Simmons. Based on a scene from Act II, scene II of William Shakespeare's comedy play A Midsummer Night's Dream, it measures .

Paintings of fairies had a resurgence of popularity in the 19th century with many based on scenes from A Midsummer Night's Dream and Simmons produced several pieces in this genre. According to Christopher Wood, an expert in Victorian art, the details included in Simmons' fairy paintings were "executed with an astonishing clarity" and gave the impression they had been painted on a glass surface. The majority of Simmons' depictions of fairies were of naked females and Wood considered them the "bunny girls of the Victorian era".

A watercolor painting using gouache, the artwork shows Hermia with her lover Lysander when they are lost in an enchanted wood. The couple are surrounded by a community of fairies; some are pictured in flight using their delicate wings, others are transported in chariots shackled to mice. The couple are tired and disorientated, appearing unaware of the crowds of animals and fairies around them. Lysander is seated and touching Hermia's fingers with one hand while indicating the soft forest moss with his other hand. It is the point in the tale of A Midsummer Night's Dream when he invites her to rest, saying:

The painting achieved a sale price of £42,470 when auctioned in New York by Sotheby's in May 2012, a record price for work by this artist. It had previously been auctioned by Sotheby's in London on 19 June 1984 and a decade later by Sotheby's, New York, on 25 May 1994, when it was wrongly attributed to Julius Simmons.

References
Citations

Bibliography

1870 paintings
Paintings based on works by William Shakespeare
English paintings
Works based on A Midsummer Night's Dream
Birds in art
Fairies in art
Mice and rats in art
Rabbits and hares in art
Watercolor paintings